Keshav Memorial Institute of Technology is a college of engineering in Hyderabad in the state of Telangana in south-central India.

It offers B.Tech degrees in computer science and engineering, artificial intelligence and machine learning, data science, and information technology.

References

External links
KMIT
Recruiting Companies
KMIT Finishing School

Information technology schools in India
Universities and colleges in Hyderabad, India
Educational institutions established in 2007
2007 establishments in Andhra Pradesh